Babes in Toyland is a Laurel and Hardy musical Christmas film released on November 30, 1934. The film is also known by the alternative titles Laurel and Hardy in Toyland, Revenge Is Sweet (the 1948 European reissue title), and March of the Wooden Soldiers (in the United States), a 73-minute abridged version.

Based on Victor Herbert's popular 1903 operetta Babes in Toyland, the film was produced by Hal Roach, directed by Gus Meins and Charles Rogers, and distributed by Metro-Goldwyn-Mayer. The film was originally printed in Sepiatone, but there are two computer-colorized versions.

Although the 1934 film makes use of many of the characters in the original play, as well as several of the songs, the plot is almost completely unlike that of the original stage production. In contrast to the stage version, the film's story takes place entirely in Toyland, which is inhabited by Mother Goose (Virginia Karns) and other well-known fairy tale characters.

Plot

Stannie Dum (Stan Laurel) and Ollie Dee (Oliver Hardy) live in a shoe (as in the nursery rhyme There Was An Old Woman Who Lived In A Shoe), along with Mother Peep (the Old Woman), Bo Peep (Charlotte Henry), a mouse resembling Mickey Mouse (actually played by a live monkey in a costume), and many other children. The mortgage on the shoe is owned by the villainous Silas Barnaby (Henry Brandon as a character based on the English nursery rhyme "There Was A Crooked Man"), who is looking to marry Bo-Peep. Knowing the Widow Peep is having a difficult time paying the mortgage, Barnaby offers the old woman an ultimatum – unless Bo Peep agrees to marry him he will foreclose on the shoe. Widow Peep refuses, but is worried about where she'll get the money to pay the mortgage. Ollie offers her all the money he has stored away in his savings can, only to learn that Stannie has taken it to buy peewees (a favored toy consisting of a wooden peg with tapered ends that rises in the air when struck with a stick near one end and is then caused to fly through the air by being struck again with the stick). He and Stannie set out to get the money for the mortgage from their boss, the Toymaker (William Burress). But Stannie has mixed up an order from Santa Claus (building 100 wooden soldiers at six feet tall, instead of 600 soldiers at one foot tall) and one of the soldiers, when activated, wrecks the toy shop. Stannie and Ollie are fired without getting the money.

The two then hatch a plan to sneak into Barnaby's house and steal the mortgage but are again foiled by their incompetence. Barnaby has them arrested on a burglary charge, and the two are sentenced to be dunked in the ducking stool and then banished to Bogeyland. But Barnaby agrees to drop the charges if Bo Peep will marry him. She reluctantly agrees, but not before Ollie suffers the dunking.

Stannie and Ollie come up with a new scheme. At the wedding, Ollie is present to give the bride away. After the nuptials, but before the ceremonial kiss, Ollie asks for the "wedding present" (the mortgage) from Barnaby. After inspecting it, Ollie tears it up, and then lifts the bride's veil — to reveal Stannie, who had worn Bo Peep's wedding dress to the ceremony. Bo Peep is still free of Barnaby, and the mortgage is destroyed. Ollie teases Stan about having to live with Barnaby as Stan cries saying "I don't LOVE him".

Enraged, Barnaby plots his revenge, eventually hitting on the idea of framing Bo Peep's true love, Tom-Tom (Felix Knight), on a trumped-up charge of "pignapping", and getting him banished to Bogeyland. Barnaby proceeds to abduct Little Elmer (Angelo Rossitto), one of the Three Little Pigs, and then has a henchman plant false evidence (including sausage links) in Tom-Tom's house. Tom-Tom is put on trial, convicted, and banished to the abode of the "bogeymen," Bogeyland, which he is taken to on a raft by two dunkers across an alligator-infested river. Those banished to Bogeyland never return; they are inevitably eaten alive by the bogeymen.

Meanwhile, Ollie and Stannie find evidence implicating Barnaby in the pignapping, including the fact that the alleged sausage links presented as evidence at Tom-Tom's trial are made of beef. They later find the kidnapped pig alive in Barnaby's cellar.

A manhunt commences for Barnaby, who flees to Bogeyland through a secret passageway at the bottom of an empty well. Stannie and Ollie eventually follow Barnaby down the well. Meanwhile, Bo Peep crosses the river to Bogeyland, finds Tom-Tom and explains Barnaby's trickery to him.

Tom-Tom sings Victor Herbert's Go to Sleep, Slumber Deep to Bo-Peep in an enormous cave set with giant spider webs. Barnaby catches up to Tom-Tom and Bo-Peep, and attempts to abduct Bo-Peep but gets into a fight with Tom-Tom, who gives Barnaby a well-deserved thrashing. An enraged Barnaby grabs a large stick and beats a stalactite to summon an army of Bogeymen, who chase Bo-Peep and Tom-Tom through the caverns of Bogeyland. The lovers run into Stannie and Ollie, who help them escape back through the well and are welcomed by the townspeople, who now realize Barnaby's treachery. Barnaby leads an invasion of Toyland on a fleet of rafts in a scene reminiscent of the painting of Washington Crossing the Delaware.

Ollie and Stan tell their story to Old King Cole (Kewpie Morgan), the King of Toyland, and the townspeople as two Bogeymen scale the wall and open the gate. The crowd flees in panic as the army of torch-wielding Bogeymen attacks Toyland. Ollie and Stannie run and hide in the toy shop warehouse. There they discover boxes of darts and use them to fight off the Bogeymen, thanks to Stan's skill with the game of "peewees" (and help from the three little pigs and the mouse). Stan and Ollie then empty an entire box of darts into a cannon, but as the two search for the last remaining darts, they realize instead that they should activate the wooden soldiers. The "march" alluded to in the film's title begins as the soldiers march out of the toy shop (filmed in a stop-motion animation sequence by Roy Seawright). The scene changes to live-action as the soldiers attack the Bogeymen with the bayonets of their rifles. Barnaby is defeated and trapped and covered by blocks that spell "rat", while the Bogeymen are routed and driven back into Bogeyland, where alligators appear to feast on them, although this is never made clear. With the kingdom of Toyland saved, Stan and Ollie decide to give the Bogeymen a parting shot with the dart-filled cannon. But as Stan aims the cannon and lights the fuse, and Ollie turns away to avoid the loud blast, the barrel of the cannon flips backward and unleashes the barrage of darts on Ollie, covering his back with darts. The film ends with Stan pulling them out one by one as Ollie winces.

Cast

Songs

The film features only six musical numbers from the enormous stage score, though that is fitting for a musical with only a 78-minute running time. Included in the film, in the order in which they are performed, are: "Toyland" (opening), "Never Mind Bo-Peep", "Castle in Spain", "Go to Sleep (Slumber Deep)", and "March of the Toys" (an instrumental piece).

Also included in the film is an instrumental version of "I Can't do the Sum" for the running theme of Laurel and Hardy's scenes. Another song, "Who's Afraid of the Big Bad Wolf?", is not one of the original stage songs but appears in the Three Little Pigs segment, heard only as an instrumental piece.

The opening song is performed by Mother Goose and an offscreen chorus; most of the others are sung by Bo Peep and/or Tom-Tom. While none of the songs is performed by Laurel and Hardy, the two briefly dance and march in a memorable scene to "March of the Toys".

Production
RKO Pictures considered purchasing the property as an animated feature film to be shot in Technicolor by Walt Disney, however the projected price of the film gave pause to RKO's plans. Hal Roach, who had seen the play as a boy, acquired the film rights to the project in November 1933.

The film was completed in November 1934. The village of Toyland was built on sound stages at Hal Roach Studios with the buildings painted in vivid storybook colors, leading Stan Laurel to regret that the film wasn't shot in Technicolor. The film was originally produced in Sepiatone and later Colorized.

Reception
Critics' reviews were positive. Andre Sennwald of The New York Times called the film "an authentic children's entertainment and quite the merriest of its kind that Hollywood has turned loose on the nation's screens in a long time." Variety proclaimed it "a film par excellence for children. It's packed with laughs and thrills and is endowed with that glamour of mysticism which marks juvenile literature." John Mosher wrote in The New Yorker: "It's certainly far more successful than was last year's Alice in Wonderland, and the children will probably be far less bored by it than they generally are by those films designed especially for them". Film Daily called it "delightful musical fantasy" and "dandy entertainment". The Chicago Tribune review read: "It's been many a long day since I've had so much pure (and I MEAN pure!) fun as I had watching this picture".

Babes in Toyland, one of many feature films with Stan Laurel and Oliver Hardy, was also popular at the box office. However, many years later in a filmed interview, Hal Roach admitted that on its first release the film lost money. After it appeared in theaters, it was re-released several times with the title constantly changed, to make it seem to audiences that they were going to see a different film. It surfaced as a holiday movie on TV as March of the Wooden Soldiers, where it was rerun annually on some local affiliates for many years. On one local Atlanta station, the film was shown as a Thanksgiving special only a few weeks before the release of its 1961 Disney Technicolor remake, so that those who saw it on television and then saw the Disney film version over the Christmas holiday had the experience of seeing two different versions of the same work, within a few weeks of each other.

A holiday staple, this film was shown by many television stations in the United States during the Thanksgiving/Christmas holiday season, each year, during the 1960s and 1970s. In New York City, it continues to run (as of 2022) on WPIX as March of the Wooden Soldiers, airing on that station in the daytime on Thanksgiving Day and Christmas Day. It also runs nationally, on occasion, on This TV, as well as Turner Classic Movies.

Copyright status

The original 79-minute film is under copyright to Prime TV Inc., the assets of which as of 2020 are owned by Nexstar Media Group, with Metro-Goldwyn-Mayer Studios (under Orion Pictures, which like MGM is now part of the Amazon corporation) still handling partial distribution rights of the film.

In 1950 a 73-minute edited version was distributed by Lippert Pictures, retitled March of the Wooden Soldiers; it was released without a copyright notice. The edited version of the film had the opening tune "Toyland" trimmed and the "Go to Sleep (Slumber Deep)" number cut completely. Also removed were Barnaby's attempted abduction of Little Bo-Peep and his ultimate fistfight with Tom-Tom. March of the Wooden Soldiers has been distributed by many motion picture and home video companies over the decades, as if it were in the public domain; however, because it relies entirely on copyrighted material from the 1934 film, March of the Wooden Soldiers itself falls under the same copyright as its parent film and will not truly enter the public domain until that film's copyright expires in 2030. Nexstar has not enforced its copyright on March of the Wooden Soldiers, effectively making the film an orphan work.

History
Hal Roach first sold the film to Federal Films. Federal Films, in turn, leased the rights to Lippert Pictures. In the early 1960s, Prime TV took over distribution. Shortly thereafter, Prime TV passed distribution on to WPIX and its eventual owners, Tribune Broadcasting. In the 1970s, Thunderbird Films released 16 mm prints drawn from a heavily spliced (and incomplete) master. In the 1980s, Tribune leased the film to The Samuel Goldwyn Company. The Samuel Goldwyn Company's select holdings (particularly the non-Samuel Goldwyn-produced films) ultimately became part of the Orion Pictures library. Finally, Orion became a division of Metro-Goldwyn-Mayer, thus after nearly eight decades, bringing partial rights full circle. In 2019, the underlying rights to the film became the property of Tribune successor Nexstar Media Group.

In 1991, the complete film was restored and colorized by American Film Technologies for television showings and video release by The Samuel Goldwyn Company. In 2006, the complete print was again restored and colorized by Legend Films, using the latest technology. Although the Legend Films release was advertised under its reissue title, both the color and black-and-white prints featured the original title and opening credits.

In popular culture

In the Season 4 episode "Inauguration: Over There (Part 2)" of the American television series The West Wing, President Jed Bartlett (played by Martin Sheen) views the scene in which the wooden soldiers are activated when trying to end a genocidal conflict in Kundhu.

See also
 List of Christmas films
 List of films with a 100% rating on Rotten Tomatoes, a film review aggregator website
 Parade of the Wooden Soldiers

References

Citations

General sources 

 
 Everson, William K. The Complete Films of Laurel and Hardy. New York: Citadel, 2000, (first edition 1967). .
 Louvish, Simon. Stan and Ollie: The Roots of Comedy. London: Faber & Faber, 2001. .
 McCabe, John. Babe: The Life of Oliver Hardy. London: Robson Books Ltd., 2004. .
 McCabe, John with Al Kilgore and Richard W. Bann. Laurel & Hardy. New York: Bonanza Books, 1983, first edition 1975, E.P. Dutton. .
 McGarry, Annie. Laurel & Hardy. London: Bison Group, 1992. .

External links

 
 
 
 
 
 

1934 films
1930s fantasy films
1934 musical comedy films
American black-and-white films
American children's adventure films
American children's comedy films
American children's fantasy films
American Christmas films
American coming-of-age films
American fantasy adventure films
American musical comedy films
American musical fantasy films
1930s English-language films
Films about sentient toys
Films about children
Films directed by Charley Rogers
Films directed by Gus Meins
Laurel and Hardy (film series)
Metro-Goldwyn-Mayer films
Operetta films
Santa Claus in film
Films using stop-motion animation
Films set in a fictional country
1930s Christmas films
1930s American films